The 1939–40 La Liga was the ninth season since its establishment and the first one after the Spanish Civil War, that forced to suspend the competition during three years. The season started on December 3, 1939, and finished on April 28, 1940.

Despite being relegated in the previous season, Atlético Aviación won its first title ever.

Format changes
For this season, the team qualified in the 10th position would face the second qualified team from Segunda División in a single-game play-off at a neutral venue. The winner would play the next season of La Liga.

Team locations

Due to the several damages in Estadio Buenavista after the Spanish Civil War, Oviedo did not play this season. However, the Spanish Football Federation assured them a berth in the 1940–41 La Liga.

Athletic Madrid changed its name to Athletic Aviación, after its merge with Aviación Nacional. Despite being relegated to Segunda División, it remained in the league by winning a play-off match against Osasuna for occupying the vacant berth after the resignation of Oviedo. Due to the damages at Estadio Metropolitano de Madrid, they played their games during this season at Estadio Chamartín, and one game at Vallecas.

Celta and Zaragoza made their debut in La Liga.

League table

Results

Relegation play-off
The play-off match was played at Estadio Chamartín in Chamartín de la Rosa.

|}

Top scorers

References

External links
LFP website

1939 1940
1939–40 in Spanish football leagues
Spain